Ghlin is a village of Wallonia and a district of the municipality of Mons, located in the province of Hainaut, Belgium.

People born in Ghlin 
 Charles Plisnier (1896–1952), writer winner of the Prix Goncourt in 1937

See also 
Grand Large

Sub-municipalities of Mons
Former municipalities of Hainaut (province)
Belgium geography articles needing translation from French Wikipedia